Robert Henare is a New Zealand former rugby league footballer who played professionally for the St. George Dragons.

Playing career
In 1996 Henare was a junior with the Illawarra Steelers and also captained the Junior Kiwis.

Henare spent 1997, 1998 and 1999 in Australia with the St. George Dragons where he played three first grade games.

In 2000 and 2001 he played in the Bartercard Cup with the Canterbury Bulls and was part of their 2000 Grand Final winning side.

In 2002 he played with the Port Kembla Blacks in the Illawarra Rugby League competition. He played well enough to rejoin the St George Illawarra Dragons in 2004 and played in the NSWRL Premier League.

Representative career
Henare represented the New Zealand Māori in 1999. In 2001 he was picked for the South Island in a match against France.

References

New Zealand rugby league players
New Zealand Māori rugby league players
New Zealand Māori rugby league team players
St. George Dragons players
Canterbury rugby league team players
South Island rugby league team players
Junior Kiwis players
Living people
Rugby league locks
1978 births